Unciolidae is a family of crustaceans in the order Amphipoda. There are about 9 genera and more than 20 described species in Unciolidae.

Genera
These nine genera belong to the family Unciolidae:
 Dryopoides Stebbing, 1888
 Janice Griffiths, 1973
 Klebang Azman & Othman, 2012
 Orstomia Myers, 1998
 Ritaumius Ledoyer, 1978
 Uncinotarsus L'Hardy & Truchot, 1964
 Unciola Say, 1818
 Wombalano Thomas & Barnard, 1991
 Zoedeutopus J.L.Barnard, 1979

References

Further reading

 
 

Amphipoda
Crustacean families